Ellen Margrethe Stein (8 October 1893 – 2 April 1979) was a Danish actress. She appeared in more than 45 films between 1933 and 1978.

Selected filmography
 En fuldendt gentleman (1937)
 The Invisible Army (1945)
 Lucky Journey (1947)
 Dorte (1951)
 We Who Go the Kitchen Route (1953)
 Seksdagesløbet (1958)
 Svinedrengen og prinsessen på ærten (1962)
 The Girl and the Press Photographer (1963)
 Oh, to Be on the Bandwagon! (1972)
 Me and the Mafia (1973)

References

External links

1893 births
1979 deaths
Danish film actresses
Actresses from Copenhagen